Portland, Maine, is home to many neighborhoods.

Arts District
 
Portland's Arts District is based around Congress Street in downtown Portland. The District includes the Portland Museum of Art, the Children's Museum of Maine, the Maine College of Art (MECA) and the State Theatre. It is a mixed use neighborhood with both apartments and commercial establishments.

Back Cove
Back Cove is a neighborhood off of Portland's peninsula and downtown areas. The neighborhood is mostly residential with some commercial business located within Woodford's Corner and along Ocean Avenue. With views of the Portland skyline across Back Cove, the Back Cove neighborhood borders the neighborhoods of Deering Center, North Deering, East Deering, Rosemont, and Oakdale. Neighborhood boundaries are: Washington Avenue (North), Baxter Boulevard (East), Forest Avenue (South), and Canco Road (West).

Within the boundaries of the Back Cove neighborhood are Woodford's Corner, Ocean Avenue, Cheverus High School (a private Jesuit school), and Ocean Avenue School (a Portland Public Schools elementary school). Landscape architect Carl Rust Parker designed the Boulevard Park subdivision of 110 homes in 1912, while Baxter Boulevard was being constructed. The neighborhood includes many historic homes. The John B. Russwurm House and the Sparrow House are located within the Back Cove neighborhood.

The Back Cove Trail is one of the oldest trails in Portland. It is 3.6 miles long and circles Bay Cove and connects to Payson Park, the Bayside Trail, and the East End Trail. Payson Park is a 48 acre park located within the neighborhood with baseball and softball fields, basketball courts, tennis courts, a playground, an ice skating rink, a sledding hill, ski and snowboarding park, a playground, a community garden, and the Longfellow Arboretum. The small Barrows Park and Heseltine Park and the George Street Cemetery are located within the Back Cove neighborhood.

See also
Back Cove estuary basin in Portland, Maine

External links
City of Portland
Back Cove Neighborhood Association
Ocean Avenue Elementary School

Bayside 
Bayside is the downtown neighborhood located between the Old Port and Back Cove. It is a mix of residential and commercial properties and old and new architecture. The neighborhood is bounded by Forest Avenue, I-295, Congress Street, and Franklin Street. It is bordered by the neighborhoods of Parkside, the Old Port, and East Bayside. It is represented by the Bayside Neighborhood Association. It is often confused with the East Bayside neighborhood, which is on the opposite side of Franklin Street. 

Portland High School, whose original building that is the school's middle wing was built in 1863, and Baxter Academy, a charter high school with a STEM curriculum, are both located in the neighborhood. Merrill Auditorium is located in the neighborhood. The state's only Whole Foods and Trader Joe's supermarkets are located in the Bayside neighborhood. Notable buildings in the Bayside neighborhood include the Schlotterbeck and Foss Building, an historic art deco factory building built in 1927 and that is now apartments, and Franklin Towers, a high-rise apartment building constructed in 1969. Greater Portland Landmarks has documented that Bayside has some of the earliest homes in Portland, including Federal and Greek Revival homes, because most of the neighborhood was not burned in the Great Fire of 1866. The City of Portland's former Public Works operation center in Bayside has been redeveloped to be a commercial center comprising restaurants, breweries, distilleries, exercise studios, a bowling alley, and many new apartment buildings.

The Bayside Bowl bowling alley is located in the Bayside neighborhood next to the former Public Works operation and since 2014 it has been hosting the PBA League Elias Cup team competition. The PBA League said Bayside Bowl has rejuvenated its event. 

The Bayside Trail begins on Elm Street in the Bayside neighborhood. The trail goes across the Franklin Street divided throughway and then through East Bayside and then connects to the East End Trail and the Back Cove Trail. The Stone Street Playground is located in the neighborhood and is popular in the summertime because of the splash pad fountain and the proximity to the Old Port. The neighborhood association rents plots in the community garden located on Chestnut Street across from the Daymark condominium building that was built in 2022.

Deering Center
 Deering Center is a neighborhood that runs from Brighton Avenue to Forest Avenue to Catherine McAuley High School near Wayside Street on Ludlow Street. Formerly known as the town of Deering, Maine (named for Capt. James Deering, horse farmer and early resident of Deering), which separated from Westbrook in 1871. It was incorporated into Portland as Deering Center on March 9, 1899.

Deering Highlands
Deering Highlands is a residential neighborhood on a hill generally bordered by Woodford Street to the north; Stevens Avenue to the west; Deering Street to the east and the sloping hillside of streets in the same area, south of Brighton Avenue. The map on Barry & Anderson's Deering: A Social and Architectural History, p. 15 is ambiguous as to the neighborhood's precise borders.

Deering Highlands was developed in the late 19th century, and maintains much of its original historical character,  including numerous examples of architecture by John Calvin Stevens, Frederick A Tompson, and other regional architects.  Among Highlands' most notable historical residents was controversial US Senator Ralph Owen Brewster, who owned the House at 79 Highland Street.

The neighborhood is almost entirely residential, but the largest institutional feature of the Highlands is Maine Medical Center's Brighton Avenue Campus (formerly known as the Brighton Medical Center). The complex is now home of the New England Rehabilitation Hospital of Portland and also houses training facilities and an urgent care center.

Downtown

East Deering
East Deering is the city's easternmost neighborhood. The area was annexed by Portland alongside other Deering neighborhoods. The first Europeans to settle in the area were farmers. Now a suburban and residential neighborhood, it is situated between the Munjoy Hill and North Deering, as well as the town of Falmouth. East Deering is an economically diverse place, featuring a combination of public housing, privately owned apartments, small single-family homes as well as larger, more expensive single-family homes.  Much of the neighborhood has views of Casco Bay and nearby Mackworth Island.  East Deering was bisected by 295 in the 1960s. Major landmarks in this neighborhood include Tukey's Bridge, the Burnham and Morrill Co. (B&M) Baked Bean manufacturing plant, Martin's Point, Presumpscot School, Grand Trunk Cemetery, Payson Park, and Lunts Corner.

The major throughways in East Deering are Washington Avenue and Veranda Street. Martin's Point Bridge connects East Deering to Falmouth.

East Bayside

East Bayside is a neighborhood in Portland, Maine. It is bordered by Franklin Street on the west, Washington Avenue on the east, to the north by Marginal Way, and the south by Congress Street.  It is bordered by the neighborhoods of Bayside, the Old Port and Munjoy Hill. It was first developed a street network in the early 19th century. By the 1820s the area was Portland's second seaport via the Back Cove's ship channel. Much of the debris from the great Portland fire of 1866 was deposited into Back Cove, significantly increasing the size of East Bayside. Maps produced around 1900 show an extension of the shoreline out to Marginal Way. The shoreline would not change again until the construction of the Interstate in 1974. East Bayside is often confused with Bayside, which is the neighborhood on the opposite side of Franklin Street. East Bayside is represented by the East Bayside Neighborhood Organization.

East End

  

The East End is a neighborhood on the far eastern end of Portland's peninsula. It is closely linked with Munjoy Hill and the Eastern Promenade. The East End Community School, located on North Street, serves the area. The East End Beach is also located there. Notable buildings include the Portland Observatory at the top of Munjoy Hill.

Libbytown
Libbytown is a neighborhood in southern and western Portland, wedged between the Stroudwater, Rosemont, Oakdale, and Parkside neighborhoods, and separated from the city of South Portland by the Fore River. Maine's busiest public transit hub, the Portland Transportation Center, is in Libbytown.

It was originally settled by Irish Catholic immigrants. Described as cohesive, it began to decline following the 1961 destruction of Union Station on St. John Street. It is named after the Libby family, who immigrated from Ireland in the mid-nineteenth century and set up three businesses between Park Avenue and outer Congress Street. It extends to the intersection of Stevens Avenue and Congress Street. Tony's Donuts, a donut shop, was established in the neighborhood in 1965.

Nasons Corner
The area around outer Brighton Avenue is Nasons Corner. While part of the independent town of Deering in the 1890s, the area was primarily agricultural, with acres of strawberries and fields of hay. Capisic Brook runs through part of the neighborhood, and its banks were home to the Lucas and Hamblet family-run brickyards, which were sold throughout New England. In 1898, Nasons Corner and the rest of Deering was annexed by the City of Portland. The earliest housing developments in the neighborhood were built beginning around that time and were called Brighton Avenue Terrace and Portland Garden (now Holm Street and Taft Street). The Glenwood project was underway by 1900. It included affordable bungalow style homes named for English counties (Devon, Dorset, Essex, Kent, and Warwick). The Glenwood Baptist Church was built by the 1950s.  The park will be part of a greening effort to restore its intended use as a "Learning Environment" by building new natural play scapes.  A partnership between the City of Portland, the Nason's Corner Neighborhood Association, Breakwater School and Portland Trails.  They broke ground on Tuesday, October 29, 2013, and should be completed by the fall of 2014

Sagamore Village
During World War II, many rural Mainers moved to Portland due to labor shortages in the booming defense industry based around Portland harbor. In 1943, Sagamore Village was built to ease the housing shortage. It was owned and operated by the federal government until 1953. It was a multiracial and multiethnic community, which was unique for many of the residents. Following the end of the war, the federal government sought to sell housing developments like Sagamore and Redbank in neighboring South Portland. Initially, the City Council rebuffed calls to purchase the housing development but in 1950, it reversed its position due to public pressure and purchased the housing complex. It was opened for low income individuals.

North Deering

North Deering is the northernmost neighborhood of the city of Portland, Maine.  It is situated next to the Riverton and East Deering neighborhoods of the city, as well as the town of Falmouth.  It is home to some of the oldest surviving houses in the city, because the neighborhood was spared all of the four fires that plagued much of the rest of the city in the past.  In  North Deering's early history it had an agriculture and lumber based economy, but with the spread of the automobile, North Deering became more economically connected to the rest of the city.  Today it has become a suburban neighborhood with some retail activity. It is home to WGME, Portland's local CBS affiliate. The Presumpscot River Preserve, a  nature preserve, is located in North Deering. It was purchased and preserved in 2001 by the Land for Maine Future program as well as the City Land Bank Commission and Portland Trails.

It is served by Harrison Lyseth Elementary School, and Lyman Moore Middle School (which also serves the East Deering and Munjoy Hill neighborhoods).  North Deering high school aged students choose between attending Portland High School, Deering High School, or Casco Bay High School, all three of which serve the entire city.

Oakdale
Oakdale is a primarily residential, university neighborhood. It is comprised of mostly owner-occupied homes, a few businesses, and the Portland campus of the University of Southern Maine. All the neighborhood is within walking distance of the university. The neighborhood is bounded by Ashmont Street, Devonshire Street, St. John Street, I-295, and Baxter Boulevard. Oakdale's residents are part of the Woodfords-Oakdale Neighborhood Association. 

The neighborhood includes the Southworth Planetarium, the Sullivan Athletic Complex, and the Glickman Library. Parks in the neighborhood include Baxter Boulevard, Longfellow Park, Noyes Park, and Fessenden Park. The Deering Avenue bridge connects the neighborhood to the neighboring Deering Oaks and the city's athletic complex of Fitzpatrick Stadium, Hadlock Field, Portland Expo, and Troubh Ice Arena. Commercial businesses are mainly located along Forest Avenue. 

The historic Nathan Clifford School, built in 1907, was the neighborhood school until it was closed in 2011 and replaced by the Ocean Avenue Elementary School. In 2013, the city sold the Nathan Clifford School for $1 to the Developers Collaborative. It was supposed to primarily include "high-density affordable housing"  but instead the developers "remodeled the building to create 22 market-rate apartments." On January 27, 2014, the former schoolhouse was listed on the National Register of Historic Places.

Old Port
 The Old Port (sometimes known as the Old Port Exchange) is a neighborhood of Portland, Maine, known for its cobblestone streets, 19th-century brick buildings and fishing piers. The district is filled with boutiques, restaurants and bars. Because of its reputation for nightlife, the Old Port is a popular destination for tourists and locals alike.  It is bordered by the neighborhoods of Bayside, East Bayside, Munjoy Hill and the West End.

Parkside

Parkside neighborhood, located at the base of the Portland peninsula, is bordered by Interstate 295 on the far side of Deering Oaks, Forest Avenue on the East, Congress Street on the south, and Weymouth Street on the west. Parkside borders the neighborhoods of West End. Bayside and Libbytown. Herb Adams, a local historian, resides in and represented the district in the Maine House of Representatives. The neighborhood began following the 1866 Great Fire of Portland, Maine when most of Portland's waterfront and downtown were burned. Residents moved south across the peninsula and laid out Sherman Ave. and Grant Ave. (now streets), named after Civil War generals William Tecumseh Sherman and future President Ulysses S. Grant. The homes in the neighborhood are primarily triple decker buildings and soon after its founding became home to much of Portland's Italian and Irish immigrant populations. The neighborhood was previously known for rampant drug use and prostitution.

Peaks Island
 Peaks Island is the most populous island in Casco Bay, Maine and is part of the city of Portland. It is approximately 3 miles (4.8 km) from downtown. The island is served by Casco Bay Lines and is home to its own elementary school, library, and police station. It is the only island in Casco Bay that allows cars throughout the island due to its size.

Riverton

Riverton neighborhood is located in northwestern Portland. The Riverton Trolley Park, established in 1896, was located in the neighborhood. The park closed in 1929. At the time, it was a premier leisure destination. A trolley brought people from Monument Square to the area. A branch of the Portland Public Library is located there as well. Riverton Elementary School serves as the neighborhood school. The University of New England merged with Westbrook College in 1996, with Westbrook College's campus in Riverton becoming UNE's Portland Campus. It is home of the Westbrook College Historic District.

Rosemont
Rosemont is a neighborhood in Portland located close to Deering Center and other off-peninsula neighborhoods. Longfellow Elementary School, Lincoln Middle School and Deering High School are located here. The local branch library, Burbank Library, is one of the highest circulating libraries in Maine. Capisic Pond, an important recreational site, is located here.

Saint John Valley

The Saint John Valley Neighborhood is located between the West End and Libbytown neighborhoods, bordered by the Parkside Neighborhood and the Fore River.

Northern Boundary: Interstate 295
Eastern Boundary: The Western Promenade, including the Maine Medical Center Campus; Congress Street, and Weymouth Street continuing along the north side of Hadlock Field to I-295.
Western Boundary:  Along the Fore River from Veterans Bridge to I-295.
Southern Boundary: The intersection of Valley Street, Veterans Bridge, and Commercial Street.

The Saint John Valley Neighborhood Association was created in 2008 in an effort to define an area of the city that lacked funding and recognition. Since its inception, many improvements have been made and more are planned, such as traffic calming, beautification, and over-all streetscaping to create a more pedestrian friendly environment. The area north of I-295 and south of St. John Street is claimed by both The Saint John Valley and Libbytown Neighborhood Associations.

Stroudwater
Stroudwater is located in the southwest corner of Portland, bordered by the Nasons Corner and Libbytown neighborhoods to the north and east, the city of Westbrook to the west, and the city of South Portland to the south. Maine's busiest airport, the Portland International Jetport, originally known as Stroudwater Field, is located here. Stroudwater is home to a number of historic structures, including the oldest standing publicly accessible building in Portland, the Tate House and Museum, which was built in 1755. The Stroudwater Historic District is also located here. It is home to the mouth of the Stroudwater River. The James Forder house, built in Stroudwater in 1730 at 1235 Westbrook Street, is recognized as the oldest house in Portland.

Stroudwater was founded as a hamlet which, with power generated by the Stroudwater River and Fore Rivers, was an important producer of masts for the Royal Navy. In the 2000s, Stroudwater was considered a quiet suburb of Downtown Portland, though it is still officially within the city boundaries.

West End

 
The West End is a neighborhood in Portland, Maine. Located on the western side of Portland's peninsula, it includes a number of historical and well-preserved architecture.

Noted for its architecture, the West End is home to a number of historical homes and the Western Promenade Historic District. In 2010, it was called "one of the best preserved Victorian neighborhoods in the country". The Western Promenade features prominently in the neighborhood. Other historical buildings include The Gothic House, Harrison B. Brown House, A.B. Butler House, Joseph Holt Ingraham House, Morrill Mansion, William Minott House and Waynflete School. The Western Cemetery, Portland's primary cemetery from 1829 to 1852, is located in the neighborhood as well. Maine Medical Center, Maine's largest hospital and Portland's largest employer, is also located in the West End. Queen Anne's Hospital was established in the West End in 1918. Renamed Mercy Hospital, it is now the fourth largest hospital in Maine.

References